Brain-specific angiogenesis inhibitor 1-associated protein 2-like protein 1 is a protein that in humans is encoded by the BAIAP2L1 gene.

References

Further reading

External links